Avram Goldstein (3 July 1919 – 1 June 2012) was a professor of pharmacology who was one of the discoverers of endorphins and a noted expert on addiction.

Goldstein established the Pharmacology Department at Stanford University School of Medicine. He was awarded the Franklin Medal and was elected to the National Academy of Sciences. He was an atheist.

References

External links

1919 births
2012 deaths
American atheists
American pharmacologists
Stanford University School of Medicine faculty
Members of the United States National Academy of Sciences
Members of the National Academy of Medicine